The Tourism Authority of Thailand (TAT) is an organization of Thailand under the Ministry of Tourism and Sports. Its mandate is to promote Thailand's tourism industry, and protect the environment.

History

An organization called Tourism of Thailand was founded in 1924. For 50 years, responsibility for attracting tourists to Thailand bounced around between the State Railway of Thailand, the Ministry of Commerce, the Ministry of Transport and the Office of the Prime Minister. The Tourism Authority of Thailand (TAT) was established on 4 May 1979.

Initiatives
TAT uses the slogan "Amazing Thailand" to promote Thailand internationally. In 2015, this was supplemented by a "Discover Thainess" campaign.

In 2015, TAT introduced a campaign titled "2015: Discover Thainess." TAT Governor Thawatchai Arunyik said the campaign will incorporate the "twelve values" that Thai junta leader and Prime Minister Prayut Chan-o-cha wants all Thais to practice.

In 2017, the Thai government approved a 144 million baht budget to fund the Michelin Guide in a five-year contract to create Michelin Guides for Thailand, starting with Bangkok. The Michelin Guide to Bangkok was released on 6 December 2017.

At the 69th Cannes Film Festival in 2016 Thailand introduced a cash rebate policy for foreign films shot in Thailand. It took effect in January 2017.

Budget
TAT's budget for FY2017 is 7,094.8 million baht.

See also
 Tourism in Thailand

References

Tourism in Thailand
Tourism agencies
State enterprises of Thailand
Government agencies established in 1949